Zelos may refer to:

 An alternate spelling of Zelus of Greek mythology
 Zelos Wilder, a character in the Nintendo GameCube game Tales of Symphonia
 Zelos, the main antagonist from Konami's side-shooter; Salamander (video game)
 Frog Zelos, a character in Saint Seiya
 "Zelos" (song), a 2016 song by South Korean boy band VIXX